Ny Kongensgade 5 is an 18th-century  property located in the small Frederiksholm Neighborhood of central Copenhagen, Denmark.  The building shares a small courtyard with Ny Kongensgade 7. It was listed in the Danish registry of protected buildings and places in 1950.

History

18th century

The Frederiksholm quarter was created on reclaimed land in the 1660s. The property was formerly part of a larger property, listed in Copenhagen's first cadastre of 1689 as No. 294 in the cityøs West Quarter. It was owned by Christen Jensen at that time. The property was later divided into what is now Ny Kongensgade 3-5 and Ny Kongensgade 7. The present building on the site was built as a distiller's house before 1732. The area escaped the devastating Copenhagen Fire of 1728 and the building may therefore predate this year.   The owners operated a distillery in the courtyard. In 1751, it was owned by a distiller named Christen Nielsen. His property was listed in the new cadastre of 1756 as No. 339.

19th century
The property was listed in the new cadastre of 1806 as No. 235. IT was owned by Nikolaj Jørgensen at that time. In 1811, it was divided again into No. 234A (Ny Kongensgade 5) and No. 234B (Ny Kongensgade 3).

The property was home to 20 residents in three households at the 1880 census. Peter Andersen, a grocer (urtekræmmer), resided on the ground floor with his wife Maren Severine Andersen født Bai, his 22-uear-old son Anker Severin Andersen and one maid. Poul Madsen, a smith (beslagsmed), resided on the first floor with his wife Anna Kirstine Madsen født Jørgensen, his brother-in-law Kristen Jørgensen Kathave, a five-year-old foster child and three lodgers. Peter Jensen, a haulier, resided on the second floor with his wife Maren Margrethe Jensen født Sørensen, their three children (aged one to nine) and three lodgers.

2+th century
 

A tavern was for many years operated in the ground floor. It was in the 1900s operated by a Mr. Wilhelm Gansen under the name Kronen )The Crowwn)

The building was subject to comprehensive restoration work in 1999.

Architecture
The building is a typical example of the buildings that dominated many smaller streets in Copenhagen in the 17th century. It consists of two storeys over a cellar and is finished by a Mansard roof with a three-bay wall dormer. It was heightened with one storey in the 1740s. A three-storey, half-timbered  side wing from 1751 extends from the rear side of the building.

Today
The building contains one condominium on each of the three floors.

References

External links

Listed residential buildings in Copenhagen
Distilleries in Copenhagen
Timber framed buildings in Copenhagen